T75 may refer to:

 T-75 cannon, a Taiwanese 20mm rotary cannon
 T75 pistol, a Taiwanese pistol
 T75 Light machine gun, a Taiwanese light machine gun